Jia Wang is an engineer at AT&T Labs Research in Bedminster, New Jersey. Wang was named a Fellow of the Institute of Electrical and Electronics Engineers (IEEE) in 2016 for contributions to measurement and management of large operational networks.

References

Fellow Members of the IEEE
Living people
Year of birth missing (living people)
Place of birth missing (living people)